John Benjamin Sanborn Jr. (November 9, 1883 – March 7, 1964) was a United States circuit judge of the United States Court of Appeals for the Eighth Circuit and previously was a United States district judge of the United States District Court for the District of Minnesota.

Education and career
Born on November 9, 1883, in Saint Paul, Minnesota, Sanborn received a Bachelor of Arts degree in 1905 from the University of Minnesota and a Bachelor of Laws in 1907 from the St. Paul College of Law (now Mitchell Hamline School of Law). He entered private practice in Saint Paul from 1907 to 1916, a portion of that time with the firm owned by future United States Supreme Court Justice Pierce Butler and future United States Attorney General William D. Mitchell. He was a member of the Minnesota House of Representatives from 1913 to 1915. He was Comptroller of Insurance for the State of Minnesota from 1917 to 1918 and from 1919 to 1920.

On August 12, 1918, with the outbreak of world War I, he resigned as insurance commissioner and joined the United States Army, where he initially became a private. He was stationed at Fort Pike, Arkansas at the Infantry Central Officers Training School. He was commissioned as a first lieutenant on November 30, 1918 and was honorably discharged 4 days later on December 3. He was as a member of the Minnesota Tax Commission from 1920 to 1921. He was a Judge of the Minnesota District Court from 1922 to 1925.

Federal judicial service

Sanborn was nominated by President Calvin Coolidge on March 18, 1925, to a seat on the United States District Court for the District of Minnesota vacated by Judge Wilbur F. Booth. He was confirmed by the United States Senate on March 18, 1925, and received his commission the same day. His service terminated on February 2, 1932, due to his elevation to the Eighth Circuit.

Sanborn was nominated by President Herbert Hoover on December 19, 1931, to a seat on the United States Court of Appeals for the Eighth Circuit vacated by Judge Wilbur F. Booth. He was confirmed by the Senate on January 19, 1932, and received his commission on January 23, 1932. He assumed senior status on June 30, 1959. His service terminated on March 7, 1964, due to his death in Ramsey County, Minnesota. He was interred in Oakland Cemetery in Saint Paul.

Role in law school merger

Sanborn also played an active role in the merger that officially created William Mitchell College of Law.

References

External links
 
 

1883 births
1964 deaths
Judges of the United States Court of Appeals for the Eighth Circuit
Judges of the United States District Court for the District of Minnesota
Members of the Minnesota House of Representatives
Minnesota lawyers
Military personnel from Minnesota
Politicians from Saint Paul, Minnesota
United States Army officers
United States court of appeals judges appointed by Herbert Hoover
20th-century American judges
United States district court judges appointed by Calvin Coolidge
University of Minnesota alumni
William Mitchell College of Law alumni